

This is a list of the National Register of Historic Places listings in Arlington County, Virginia.

This is intended to be a complete list of the properties and districts on the National Register of Historic Places in Arlington County, Virginia, United States.  The locations of National Register properties and districts for which the latitude and longitude coordinates are included below, may be seen in an online map.

There are 70 properties and districts listed on the National Register in the county, including 5 National Historic Landmarks.

Current listings

|}

See also

List of National Historic Landmarks in Virginia
National Register of Historic Places listings in Virginia
National Register of Historic Places listings in Falls Church, Virginia
National Register of Historic Places listings in Alexandria, Virginia

References

 
Arlington